Ellakkal is a habitation in the Idukki district of Kerala, India. Located in the Western Ghats, it is administered by Vellathooval panchayat, as a part of the Kunchithanny village.

It is located 7 km from Rajakkad, 1.8 km from Kunchithanny and 15 km from Munnar. The Kunchithanny-Rajakkad road passes through Ellakkal.

St. Antony's Church is the main religious centre here.

References

Villages in Idukki district